"Too Little Too Late" is a single by the Barenaked Ladies from their 2000 album, Maroon. The single included a remix of another single from Maroon, "Pinch Me". Another version was also released as a "Special Enhanced CD Single" with album art work based on the song's music video.  The song is also featured on the band's 2001 compilation album, Disc One: All Their Greatest Hits. The song was written by Ed Robertson and Steven Page, and sung by Page.

Music video
The music video, directed by Phil Harder, is about the stresses of making a music video, in which the director forces them to record and re-record the video several times. At the end of the video, the director calls for a cut, and asks to record it again, prompting Page to scream. The screaming is not actually Steven's voice.  The actual video shoot was the band's longest, lasting three days.  It was filmed in the middle of a string of radio station promotional appearances.

Personnel
 Steven Page – lead vocals, handclaps
 Ed Robertson – acoustic and electric guitars, handclaps, backing vocals
 Jim Creeggan – electric bass, handclaps, backing vocals
 Kevin Hearn – clavinet, organ, sampler, handclaps, backing vocals
 Tyler Stewart – drums, tambourine, handclaps

Charts

Year-end charts

References

2000 singles
Barenaked Ladies songs
Songs written by Ed Robertson
Songs written by Steven Page
Song recordings produced by Don Was
2000 songs
Reprise Records singles
Music videos directed by Phil Harder